Paul Scherrer (20 April 1862 – 10 March 1935) was a Swiss politician and President of the Swiss Council of States (1907/1908).

External links 
 
 

1862 births
1935 deaths
Members of the Council of States (Switzerland)
Presidents of the Council of States (Switzerland)